Bzów  is a village in the administrative district of Gmina Zbuczyn, within Siedlce County, Masovian Voivodeship, in east-central Poland.

The Janotowie Bzowscy rank among the nobility of the administrative region of Kraków, Lviv and also later after the Partitions of Poland Kielce, also Lublin and the surrounding area Wołkowyska (present Belarus).

A manor was built in the first half of the 19th century, and reconstructed in 1914.

References

Villages in Siedlce County